Shay Rudolph (born September 6, 2005) is an American actress known for starring in the Netflix series The Baby-Sitters Club as Stacey McGill.
She also starred in Fox's crime-drama television series Lethal Weapon as the daughter of lead character Wesley Cole.

Filmography

Film

Television

References

External links
 
 

Living people
American television actresses
2005 births